In the United States, Patriot Day occurs on September 11 of each year in memory of the people killed in the September 11 attacks of the year 2001.

History
In the immediate aftermath of the attacks, carried out by terrorists from Al-Qaeda, President George W. Bush proclaimed Friday, September 14, 2001, as a National Day of Prayer and Remembrance for the Victims of the Terrorist Attacks on September 11, 2001.

A bill to make September 11 a national day of mourning was introduced in the U.S. House on October 25, 2001, by Rep. Vito Fossella (R-NY) with 22 co-sponsors. The result was the resolution to proclaim September 11, 2002, as the first Patriot Day.

Original co-sponsors in the House were:

 Gary Ackerman (D-NY)
 Rick Boucher (D-VA)
 Eliot Engel (D-NY)
 Phil English (R-PA)
 Randy Forbes (R-VA)
 Benjamin Gilman (R-NY)
 Felix Grucci (R-NY)
 Maurice Hinchey (D-NY)
 Steve Israel (D-NY)
 Peter T. King (R-NY)
 Ray LaHood (R-IL)
 Nita Lowey (D-NY)
 Carolyn Maloney (D-NY)
 Michael R. McNulty (D-NY)
 Jim Moran (D-VA)
 Jerry Nadler (D-NY)
 John E. Peterson (R-PA)
 Thomas M. Reynolds (R-NY)
 Ed Schrock (R-VA)
 Don Sherwood (R-PA)
 Ed Towns (D-NY)
 James T. Walsh (R-NY)

In 2017, President Donald Trump proclaimed September 8–10 as National Days of Prayer and Remembrance, and proclaimed September 11 as Patriot Day.
President Trump also did so in 2018, 2019, and 2020 as well. After Joe Biden was elected President in 2021, he also issued an Executive Order for Patriot Day 2021 and Patriot Day 2022.

Observance

The flag of the United States is flown at half-staff at the White House and on all U.S. government buildings and establishments throughout the world; Americans are also encouraged to display flags in and outside their homes. Additionally, a moment of silence is observed to correspond with the attacks, beginning at 8:46 a.m. (Eastern Daylight Time), the time the first plane, American Airlines Flight 11, struck the North Tower of the World Trade Center on September 11, 2001.

Patriot Day is not a federal holiday; schools and businesses remain open in observance of the occasion, although memorial ceremonies for the 2,977 victims are often held. Volunteer and service opportunities are coordinated by the Corporation for National and Community Service.

References

External links

 Text of the statute
 Public Law 107-89
 
 2001 proclamation, 2002, 2003, 2004, 2005, 2006, 2007, 2008, 2010, 2011
 Detailed information on the bill from THOMAS 
 U.S. Army's Patriot Day Website

Recurring events established in 2001
Aftermath of the September 11 attacks
Public holidays in the United States
September observances